Seppa East is one of the 60 Legislative Assembly constituencies of Arunachal Pradesh state in India.

The current MLA (August-2016) of this constituency is Tapuk Taku, who belongs to National People's Party. It is part of East Kameng district and is reserved for candidates belonging to the Scheduled Tribes.

Members of the Legislative Assembly

Election results

2019

See also
 List of constituencies of the Arunachal Pradesh Legislative Assembly
 West Siang district
Arunachal Pradesh Legislative Assembly

References

East Kameng district
Assembly constituencies of Arunachal Pradesh